Devon Dermott Mitchell (born December 30, 1962 in Kingston, Jamaica) is a former American football safety in the National Football League. He was drafted by the Detroit Lions in the fourth round of the 1986 NFL Draft. He played college football at Iowa. Currently holds the record for most interceptions for the Iowa Hawkeyes.

External links
Iowa Hawkeyes bio

1962 births
Living people
Sportspeople from Kingston, Jamaica
American football safeties
Iowa Hawkeyes football players
Detroit Lions players